Andreas Benedikt Ostler (21 January 1921 – 24 November 1988), known as "Anderl", was a German bobsledder who competed in the early 1950s.

As a teenager during the 1936 Winter Olympics in his home town, Anderl Ostler and future teammates at :de:Sportclub (SC) Riessersee became interested in winter sports. The games in 1940 and 1944 were canceled during the war, and Germany was not invited to the 1948 Winter Olympics.

At the 1952 Winter Olympics in Oslo, he became the first person to steer both the two-man and four-man bob to gold medals at the same Winter Olympics, together with Lorenz Nieberl pushing and braking. They were wearing American football helmets. Their 17-year-old two-man bob, officially named "Deutschland I", had written "Cognac" on its front.

When both German 4-man-teams, rivals since their pre-war youth at :de:Sportclub (SC) Riessersee in Garmisch, only qualified in mid-field, they decided to join forces. With Friedrich Kuhn
and Franz Kemser, the heaviest members of the other team that withdrew, bob "Deutschland I" won all four heats. The Gold medalists had a combined weight of 472 kg, or an average of 118 kg per person. The rules were soon altered, introducing a limit of 400 kg. The German movie :de:Schwere Jungs (2007) is based on their story.

Ostler won four medals at the FIBT World Championships with two golds in 1951 and two silvers in 1953 at home in Garmisch-Partenkirchen, each time both in two-man and four-man.

Ostler carried the flag of Germany during the opening ceremonies of the 1956 Winter Olympics in Cortina d'Ampezzo, when Germans took part as United Team of Germany.

After he retired from bobsleigh, Ostler became a gastronomer (Chef).

References

 Bobsleigh two-man Olympic medalists 1932–56 and since 1964
 Bobsleigh four-man Olympic medalists for 1924, 1932–56, and since 1964
 Bobsleigh two-man world championship medalists since 1931
 Bobsleigh four-man world championship medalists since 1930

1921 births
1988 deaths
German male bobsledders
German chefs
Bobsledders at the 1952 Winter Olympics
Bobsledders at the 1956 Winter Olympics
Olympic bobsledders of Germany
Olympic bobsledders of the United Team of Germany
Olympic gold medalists for Germany
Olympic medalists in bobsleigh
Medalists at the 1952 Winter Olympics